The Deutsche Volkspolizei (DVP, German for "German People's Police"), commonly known as the Volkspolizei or VoPo, was the national police force of the German Democratic Republic (East Germany) from 1945 to 1990. The Volkspolizei was a highly-centralized agency responsible for most civilian law enforcement in East Germany, maintaining 257,500 personnel at its peak.

History

The Volkspolizei was effectively founded in June 1945 when the Soviet Military Administration in Germany (SVAG) established central police forces in the regions of Nazi Germany it occupied following after World War II. 

The SVAG approved the arming of community-level police forces on 31 October 1945, but nevertheless remained a non-militarised force, and by 1946 the Volkspolizei comprised some 22,000 personnel. The police force experienced several challenges at this time: the proportion of non-trained personnel between 65 and 95% undermined its professionalism and turnover rates of personnel were initially as high as 50%, affecting the stability of the workforce. By 1948, Volkspolizei membership had increased to approximately 65,000, but there were still issues of political unreliability and insufficient professional aptitude, which prompted a purge of 10,000 from the force in 1949; as a consequence, 86% of its membership were now members of the ruling Socialist Unity Party of Germany. 

It was formally referred to as the Deutsche Volkspolizei ("German People's Police") from May 1949 onward, three months before the GDR's founding.

It was dissolved during German reunification in 1990, and was superseded by the Bundespolizei of the Federal Republic of Germany and the Landespolizei of the reconstituted states of Saxony, Thuringia, Saxony-Anhalt, Brandenburg, Mecklenburg-West Pomerania and Berlin.

Organization

Main administration
With the founding of the GDR in 1949, the Volkspolizei was subordinated to the Ministry of the Interior. The Volkspolizei was divided into various individual branches and specialised forces:
 Criminal Investigation Department (Hauptabteilung Kriminalpolizei)
 Railway Police Department (Hauptabteilung Transportpolizei)
 Registration Department (Hauptabteilung Pass- und Meldewesen)
 Traffic Police Department (Hauptabteilung Verkehrspolizei)
 Uniformed Police Department (Hauptabteilung Schutzpolizei)
 Fire Department (Hauptabteilung Feuerwehr)

In addition to these units, the Volkspolizei also comprised the paramilitary Kasernierte Volkspolizei (KVP, people's police in barracks), from which the National People's Army (NVA) was formed in 1956. Following this, the Volkspolizei-Bereitschaft became the main paramilitary riot and anti-insurgency unit in the GDR.

Regional commands
 Berlin Presidium of the People's Police (Präsidium der Volkspolizei)
 Eight police inspectorates (Volkspolizei-Inspektionen)
 River Police Inspectorate (Wasserschutzpolizei-Inspektion)
 Fourteen district commands—one per East German District, excluding Karl Marx Stadt.
 Area Command of the Volkpolizei in Karl-Marx-Stadt (today Chemnitz) to protect the state enterprise of Wismut AG.

Leadership
 Minister of the Interior (Minister des Innern)
 Karl Steinhoff (1949–52)
 Willi Stoph (1952–55)
 Chief of the German Volkpolizei (Chef der deutschen Volkspolizei)
 Kurt Fischer (1949–50)
 Karl Maron (1950–55)
 Minister of the Interior and Head of the German People's Police (Minister des Innern und Chef der deutschen Volkspolizei)
 Karl Maron (1955–63)
 Friedrich Dickel (1963–1989)
 Lothar Ahrendt (1989)

Function and effectiveness
The function of the Volkspolzei changed over time. During the late 1940s and early 1950s, the Volkspolizei can be regarded as the nucleus of all other armed state institutions of the GDR. It was the first institution of the East German state, from which other organisations such as the Stasi and the National People's Army originated, both at the institutional and personnel level. Over time, however, it increasingly became but one agency within the GDR's extensive security bureaucracy.

In terms of general policing duties, the Volkspolizei dealt with criminal activity as conventionally understood, such as theft, murder, and so on, but also performed duties including border protection, passport and identity controls, transport control, and the protection of sensitive buildings and areas, each of which were carried out by specialised departments. A critical part of the Volkspolizei was its grass-roots policing, introduced from 1952, whereby every GDR citizen had their own "section commissioner" (Abschnittsbevollmächtigte, ABV). Within their section, the ABV was responsible for all policing affairs regardless of branch or speciality in that area; in total, approximately 5,000 ABV positions were created all over the republic in order to cover an average of 4,000 inhabitants per section. Following the East German uprising of 1953, the number of sections and ABVs almost doubled. The purpose of the ABV was to establish and cultivate a "close connection" with their section's population, in order to fulfil conventional policing duties, as well as enable the party to penetrate society at the very moment of the construction of socialism through state power.

Police functions were also extended beyond the official, paid forces through organisations such as Combat Groups of the Working Class (Kampfgruppen der Arbeiterklasse, KdA), organised units within factories and workplaces numbering around 400,000.

The effectiveness of the Volkspolizei was questioned following the Uprising of 1953. The leaders of the SED and the Volkspolizei interpreted the response by the GDR's security apparatus as a debacle. Police stations and court houses were attacked, and throughout the disturbances sections of the Volkspolizei were effectively paralysed, with some personnel even joining the protesters. A central party report on 18 June 1953 concluded that: "A stop must be put to the general phenomenon on June 17, that people merely observed, withdrew, or allowed themselves to be ignored or disarmed." This failure by Volkspolizei personnel to engage in confrontation was another serious concern.

In response to the failings of the police response greater coordination between the Stasi, the Volkspolizei and the National People's Army was implemented. All three organisations cooperated under the local, regional, and central leaderships of the party, under the overall control of the National Defence Council. The failure by different agencies to cooperate was believed to have been partly responsible for the escalation of the June Uprising. In response, therefore, more effective coordination was instituted to ensure the rapid suppression of potential unrest and in moments of crisis, such as during August 1961 and August 1968. The efficiency of these forces and the close cooperation between state and party organs was a key factor in maintaining the outward semblance of stability from 1953 to 1989.

Membership

Recruitment and training
Recruitment to the Volkspolizei required at least ten years of education, vocational training (see education in East Germany), military service, and a history of political loyalty.

Upon joining, a recruit would take a five-month course at the Police Academy (VP-Schule). The schedule contained political education, police law, criminal law and procedures, and military-style fitness training. Afterwards the recruit completed a 6-month practical internship.

The reasons Volkspolizei officers gave for joining the force were a desire to work with people, idealism, family tradition, belief in the system and the wish to serve one's country.

From 1962, the Volkspolizei had its own school in Berlin-Biesdorf which trained around 3,500 officers up to 1989. There were several other schools. The Kasernierten Einheiten (barracks units) had their own training facilities. Officers were initially trained in the army ground forces, from 1963 at the Officers' school and from 1971 to the officers' school in Dresden-Wilder Mann.

 Fachschule des MdI "Heinrich Rau" - College of MdI "Heinrich Rau", Radebeul
 Fachschule des MdI, „ Wilhelm Pieck “ - College of the MdI, "Wilhelm Pieck", Aschersleben
 Hochschule der VP — University of the VP, Berlin-Biesdorf (Cecilienstraße)
 Humboldt-Universität zu Berlin /Sektion Kriminalistik — Humboldt University Berlin / Criminalistics Section
 Offiziershochschule Bereitschaften "Artur Becker", Dresden (Officer school for standby units, "Artur Becker", Dresden (now the headquarters of the State Criminal Office Saxony)
 Schule für Abschnittsbevollmächtigte (school for the section represented), Wolfen
 Schule des Nachrichtenwesens (School of Communication), Dommitzsch
 Spezialschule des MdI für Diensthundewesen — Special School for service dogs, Pretzsch (Elbe)
 Spezialschule des MdI für medizinische Dienste (im Bezirk Magdeburg ) - Special School of medical services (in the district of Magdeburg)
 Transportpolizei-Schule (Transport Police School), Halle (Saale)
 Verkehrspolizei-Schule "Hans Beimler" (Traffic Police School), Magdeburg
 VP-Schule "Ernst Thälmann", Neustrelitz (since 1984 central service similar school)

The Volkspolizei had approximately 80,000 full-time police officers and 177,500 volunteers.

With the accession of East Germany to the Federal Republic on 3 October 1990, authority over the police went to the newly created federal jurisdiction. About forty percent of the Volkspolizei employees had to leave the service.

Oath
The official oath that all Volkspolizei officers swore was:

Uniforms 
There were various kinds of uniforms, worn according to the work or social situation and differing in material for summer or winter wear. Most uniforms — service, semi-dress, and parade — are gray-green but the transport police wore dark blue. The better quality and texture of the cloth in officers' uniforms distinguished them from the uniforms of enlisted personnel. The field and service uniforms became normal attire in garrison and for most other duty activities.

The basic categories of uniforms were field, service, semi-dress, and parade.

Field uniforms were for only the Kasernierte Volkspolizei. The field uniform consisted of the NVA's service uniform. The uniform was worn with a field cap, service cap, or steel helmet; high black boots; and a leather belt with vertical web shoulder suspenders. In the winter, a quilted stone-grey padded suit without a camouflage pattern is worn over the service uniform. The winter uniform also includes a fur pile cap or a steel helmet, boots, knitted grey gloves, belt, and suspenders.

The service uniform was a summer service uniform for officers with a bloused jacket, worn without a shirt, trousers, and a visored service cap. The winter service uniform featured a jacket had four large patch pockets with button-down tabs, worn with a black belt, the service cap, breeches, shirt, tie, belt, and high boots are provided for officers and NCOs. For winter, there also is a long, heavy, belted overcoat.

The semi-dress uniform, except in details, was the same for all ranks and was worn on off-duty or off-post occasions. It included the service cap, jacket, long trousers, and black low-quarter shoes. The single-breasted jacket was worn without a belt, with a white or grey-green shirt and a green tie. Officers were allowed to wear the jacket with a white shirt. During periods of warm summer weather, either the shirt and tie or the jacket may be omitted. For a while a double-breasted jacket could be worn as optional wear by officers and warrant officers.

The parade uniform for officers was the semi-dress jacket worn with all awards and decorations, breeches and riding boots, steel helmet or police shako from 1950 to the late 1960s, white shirt, green neck-tie, and a ceremonial dagger on the left side, fastened to a silver-grey parade belt. Officers in guards of honour carry sabres. In winter, overcoat, scarf, and gloves were worn.

The type of work uniform worn was governed by seasonal considerations and weather. Generally, reconditioned items of service clothing; field, semi-dress and winter padded uniforms; some dyed black, were issued for all types of fatigue and maintenance details. Coveralls are also used by the lower ranks, especially heavy vehicle and flying personnel. Officers in technical branches supervising fatigue details wear a laboratory-style smock.

Other types of  uniforms existed. High-ranking officers occasionally wore white uniforms, or at least a white jacket, and staff officers were supplied with staff service uniforms. Women had their own uniforms consisting of jackets, skirts or slacks, blouses, caps, boots or pumps, and other appropriate items in accordance with the season and the occasion. Traffic police, motorcyclists, armoured vehicle personnel, and others have special items of apparel.

Volkspolizei uniform initially had green , but later reverted to white except for the transport police who wore blue. The uniform of the Kasernierte Volkspolizei is distinguished from that of the NVA ground force and Air Defence Force by a green armband with large silver letters identifying the wearer's affiliation.

Ranks 
Officers

Other ranks

Equipment
To see full list click Here

See also

 Diensteinheit IX
 Eastern Bloc politics
 Kasernierte Volkspolizei
 Stasi

Notes

References

External links

Official Site of the German Police
EAST GERMANY - A Country Study (based on information from the Library of Congress)
The Democratisation of the Police (With Reference to the Brandenburg Police) by John Chivers
 IG Deutsche Volkspolizei, in German
Volkspolizei page, at www.polizeiautos.de
 The Band of the Volkspolizei

Defunct law enforcement agencies of East Germany
Law enforcement in East Germany
Government of East Germany
Eastern Bloc
Government agencies established in 1946
1990 disestablishments in Germany
German words and phrases
Government agencies disestablished in 1990
Volkspolizei